Sornnarin Tippoch (Thai:ศรนรินทร์ ทิพย์โภชน์, born 7 June 1986) is a Thai cricketer and the former captain of the Thailand women's cricket team.

Career
Tippoch began playing cricket at the age of 21 after being scouted while playing softball at university. She captained Thailand in their first-ever international against Bangladesh in 2008.

She captained the Thailand women's cricket team in the 2017 Women's Cricket World Cup Qualifier in February 2017. In June 2018, she was named as the captain of Thailand for the 2018 ICC Women's World Twenty20 Qualifier tournament. She made her Women's Twenty20 International (WT20I) debut for Thailand on 3 June 2018, in the 2018 Women's Twenty20 Asia Cup.

In February 2019, she was the joint-leading wicket-taker in the 2019 ICC Women's Qualifier Asia tournament, with thirteen dismissals in six matches.

In August 2019, she was named as the captain of Thailand's squad for the 2019 ICC Women's World Twenty20 Qualifier tournament in Scotland. In October 2019, she was named in the Women's Global Development Squad, ahead of a five-match series in Australia. In January 2020, she was named as the captain of Thailand's squad for the 2020 ICC Women's T20 World Cup in Australia.

In November 2020, Tippoch was nominated for the ICC Women's Associate Cricketer of the Decade award. In April 2021, the Cricket Association of Thailand announced that Naruemol Chaiwai would replace Tippoch as Thailand's captain across all formats. In November 2021, she was named in Thailand's team for the 2021 Women's Cricket World Cup Qualifier tournament in Zimbabwe. She played in Thailand's first match of the tournament, on 21 November 2021 against Zimbabwe.

In October 2022, she played for Thailand in Women's Twenty20 Asia Cup.

References

External links

 

1986 births
Living people
Sornnarin Tippoch
Sornnarin Tippoch
Sornnarin Tippoch
Sornnarin Tippoch
Cricketers at the 2010 Asian Games
Cricketers at the 2014 Asian Games
Sornnarin Tippoch
Southeast Asian Games medalists in cricket
Competitors at the 2017 Southeast Asian Games
Sornnarin Tippoch
Women cricket captains